Limestone Calcined Clay Cement (LC3) is a low-carbon cement developed by the École Polytechnique Fédérale de Lausanne (EPFL), Indian Institute of Technology (IIT) Delhi, IIT-Bombay, Technology and Action for Rural Development (TARA), IIT-Madras, and the Central University of Las Villas (Cuba). The cement can reduce carbon dioxide emissions related to manufacturing by 30% as compared to ordinary Portland cement. In 2014, the LC3 project received 4m CHF in Research and Development funding from the Swiss Agency for Development and Cooperation (SDC).

History 

Limestone Calcined Clay Cement (LC3) stems from research by the EPFL. It is the result of an ongoing cooperation between EPFL and partners in India and Cuba on developing low carbon and resource efficient raw materials for cement manufacturing. In 2014, the Swiss Agency for Development and Cooperation provided CHF 4 million in funding for the research and development of LC3. Testing and standardisation was carried out by the EPFL, IIT-Delhi, IIT-Bombay, Technology and Action for Rural Development (TARA), IIT-Madras, and the Central University of Las Villas (Cuba). Part of the research focused on specific thematic areas of cement research including hydrate assemblages, pore structure, rheology, reactivity (chemistry), durability and mechanical properties, production, environmental sustainability, and cost effectiveness.

Composition 

The main components of LC3 are clinker, calcined clay, limestone, and gypsum. Its manufacturing process involves synergetic hydration. Adding large amounts of calcined clay and ground limestone to concrete mixtures, the aluminates from the clay interact with the calcium carbonates from the limestone. The additional alumina in the metakaolin reacts with the ground limestone, leading to a less porous material than other cements and providing equal strength with higher levels of clinker substitution.

Environmental impact 

Limestone Calcined Clay Cement is a low-carbon alternative to the standard Portland cement. LC3 can reduce  emissions related to cement manufacturing of cement by reducing the amount of clinker, replacing it with limestone and calcined clays. Low-grade kaoline clays can be used for the production of LC3 and are abundantly available in many parts of the world.

See also 
 Green cement
 Cement
 Limestone
 Portland cement
 FUTURECEM

References

External links 
 http://www.LC3.ch
 https://www.cementirholding.com/en/our-business/innovation/futurecem

Cement
Low-energy building